This is a list of districts in the London Borough of Hammersmith and Fulham:

Neighbourhoods

Note: All post towns are LONDON

Electoral wards

Lists of places in London